2008 summer tour may refer to:

 American Idols LIVE! Tour 2008
 John Mayer 2008 Summer Tour
 Sakis Rouvas Summer Tour 2008